Kehychivka Raion was a raion (district) in Kharkiv Oblast of Ukraine. Its administrative center was the urban-type settlement of Kehychivka. The raion was abolished on 18 July 2020 as part of the administrative reform of Ukraine, which reduced the number of raions of Kharkiv Oblast to seven. The area of Kehychivka Raion was merged into Krasnohrad Raion. The last estimate of the raion population was  

At the time of disestablishment, the raion consisted of one hromada, Kehychivka settlement hromada with the administration in Kehychivka.

References

Former raions of Kharkiv Oblast
1923 establishments in Ukraine
Ukrainian raions abolished during the 2020 administrative reform